Dhaka Senior Division Football League, or the First Division Football League, is the third tier football league in Bangladesh. Until 2006, it was the top-tier league of the country. It was officially established in 1948 as Dhaka League, while Bangladesh was still under Pakistani control. Upon the creation of the new national top-tier professional league B. League in 2007, Dhaka League was merged with Dhaka First Division League, renamed as Dhaka Senior Division Football League and re-introduced as the second tier league. Finally after the creation of Bangladesh Championship League in 2012, it became the third tier. The two top-finishing teams are automatically promoted to the Bangladesh Championship League.

History

Dhaka League (1948–1972)

Although there are records of a football league system in Dhaka which was regularly organised by the sports body of the town from 1915, it was a year after the independence of Pakistan and India, in 1948, that the Dhaka Sporting Association officially introduced a three-tiered Dhaka Football League system (Dhaka League, Second Division, Third Division), in which was then East Bengal. Initially league games were held at Paltan Maidan, until completion of the Dhaka Stadium. Dhaka's Nwabab Family also played a massive role in administrating the league during its early years. The first league title after its official inauguration was won by the Makrani dominated Victoria SC.

Sports clubs like Dhaka Wanderers and Mohammedan SC were the more successful ones and grew the base for league football among Bengalis. Regulations also prevented clubs from fielding more than five non-Bengali players, consequently Dhaka's football grew popular and a few East Pakistani footballers from the league, such as Nabi Chowdhury, Golam Sarwar Tipu, Hafizuddin Ahmed and Mari Chowdhury were selected for the Pakistan national team, which was dominated by West Pakistanis. While Makrani players like the "Pakistani Pele" Abdul Ghafoor and Turab Ali were also essential to the league's success, when the clubs took part in the Aga Khan Gold Cup. 

During the Pakistani days, a number of corporate and government owned clubs also participated in the Football League, with most of the players being employees of the parent corporations. Some of them were, PWD SC, Police AC, Dhaka Central Jail, East Pakistan Gymkhana, East Pakistan Government Press (EPGP), East Pakistan Industrial Development Corporation (EPIDC), East Pakistan Railways to name some. Following 23 uninterrupted seasons, the Dhaka League was not held in 1971, due to the Bangladesh Liberation War. After the Independence of Bangladesh, EPIDC one of the most successful corporate teams was changed into Bangladesh Jute Mills Corporation (BJMC) and East Pakistan Government Press into Bangladesh Government Press. 

On 15 July 1972, the Bangladesh Football Federation was founded, and the league was resumed only to be stopped after seven games. However, during the unfinished 1972 season, Dhaka Wanderers striker "Big" Nazir Ahmed, scored a hattrick against Dilkusha SC and thus became the first player to achieve this feat since the country's independence. The regular league format after independence had all clubs play against one another for the first 16 rounds, however, from the 17th round the top-8 teams played a single round robin known as the Super League, while club's who would finish midtable or face relegation was decided in the normal league round. The league usually consisted of 16 teams but the number of teams varied each year.

1973–1992 
In 1973, the league had its first completed season in independent of Bangladesh, as corporate owned, Team BJMC were crowned champions. In 1972, newly promoted Iqbal Sporting was reformed as Abahani Limited Dhaka, by Sheikh Kamal. The club soon made a name for themselves by signing Mohammedan SC star Kazi Salahuddin and winning the 1974 league title, thus starting the fierce rivalry between the two clubs. The following few years saw both the two Dhaka Giants dominate the domestic scene, however, during the last year of the decade, Team BJMC caused an upset by claiming the league title. The 1980s was the golden era of club football in Dhaka. Any match involving Mohammedan or Abahanii would draw huge crowds at the Dhaka stadium. Other than the two giants, Team BJMC, Brothers Union, Rahmatganj MFS and Muktijoddha Sangsad KC frequently formed strong teams while, Wari Club and Azad Sporting were seen as the ‘Giant Killers’.

In 1980, Mohammedan SC won the league with only suffering a single defeat the entire season. However, it was their rivals Abahani who dominated the Dhaka league for the first half of the decade, winning the league title in 1981, 1983, 1984 & 1985. During the 1982 season, Mohammedan striker Abdus Salam Murshedy also created history by scoring a record 27 league goals. The 1985 season was a significant year in Dhaka football, as a bold move from the Dhaka football authority saw the introduction of the 3 point system in the league, at that time, only the English League used this system. The change later helped Abahani clinch the title from Brothers Union, during the Super League round. Abahani thus became the first club from Bangladesh to participate in the Asian Club Championship, the following year.

The 1987 season saw the level of football in Dhaka reach its peak. Mohammedan signed Iranian international Reza Naalchegar while Abahani signed Iranian duo Samir Shaker and Karim Allawi. Alongside the foreign recruits Mohammedan midfielder Sayed Rumman Sabbir was the best local talent that season, while Monem Munna and Sheikh Mohammad Aslam, were already being seen as two of the best players in the subcontinent. In the end, Mohammedan's veteran midfielder Khurshid Alam Babul scored the all important goal during the last game of the season against Abahani, earning his team a crucial 3-2 victory to win the league. With the teams finishing on equal points play off matches were required, and after a 0–0 draw in the first playoff match Mohammedan secured the title with a 2–0 win in the 2nd playoff match, where no spectators were allowed into the Army Stadium, due to a fight that previously broke out between the rival fans, during the first playoff round. Mohammedan soon completed a record unbeaten hat-trick of league titles during 1988-89 season, when the league was held at the Mirpur Stadium for the first time.

Dhaka Premier Division League (1993–2006)
The start of the 90s saw the league being held inconsistently by the Bangladesh Football Federation, as after 1990 the authorities decided to take a year-long break. In 1992, the winner was again decided by the season-ending Dhaka Derby game, as  brace from Mamun Joarder helped Abahani retain the league title, after the season ended BFF decided to rename the competition as Dhaka Premier Division League due to the introduction of a new second-tier, the Dhaka First Division. The restructured league got rid of the Super league system and replaced it with a single league system, where the clubs played 16 rounds in order to decide the champions. 

In the mid-nineties, Abahani, Mohammedan and Brothers Union agreed to create a pool system in order to lower player salaries, this new agreement had created a huge impact on both national team and club performances as the players continued to dispute with the authorities of their respective clubs. In 1994, the director of Muktijoddha SKC, Manzur Quader took advantage of this situation by signing 11 national team  mainstays. Even after Muktijodda's new acquisition both Abahani and Mohammedan continued to dominate the following three years until the 1997–98 season. During the last game of the league Muktijoddha played Mohammedan who needed a point to win the league, however, Mukti's skipper Imtiaz Ahmed Nakib scored a brace and thereby won the team their first ever league title. 

In 2000, a National Football Championship started, including the first 3 teams from the Dhaka Premier League, along with the district league champions of Chittagong, Rajshahi, and the winners of a playoff between the champions of Sylhet and Barisal. The championship was introduced in order to widen the domestic football scene and help clubs outside of the capital to engage in producing more quality players, as domestic football was witnessing a decline of spectators. 

The start of the new decade saw Muktijoddha win their second league title, and although the following couple of years saw the old Dhaka duo maintain their dominance, Brothers Union proceeded to win two consecutive league titles, thanks to the partnership between Alfaz Ahmed and Arman Mia. Nevertheless, the popularity of the league kept on declining due to the country's poor performances in the international circuit and the Dhaka-based league also failed to produce local talents like before. In 2006, the BFF again canceled the league season, as most of the top-tier clubs decided focus on the National Football Championship, meaning the country did not have a functioning top-tier league for a span of two years.

Dhaka Senior Division League (2007–present)
In 2007, the B.League was launced as the country's new top-tier and first ever pressional football league by the Bangladesh Football Federation (BFF). The B.League allowed clubs outside of Dhaka to participate, as BFF attempted to decentralise domestic football. With the introduction of the new top-tier, the Dhaka Premier Division League (Dhaka League) was merged with the Dhaka First Division League (second-tier 1993–2007), and re-introduced as the country's new second-tier, Dhaka Senior Division Football League. This marked the end of  its 58 years as Bangladesh's top-tier. In 2012, after the creation of Bangladesh Championship League, it became the third-tier. The winner and runner-up of the league will be promoted to the Bangladesh Championship League, while the bottom three teams will be relegated to the Dhaka Second Division Football League.

Structure

Sponsorship

Previous winners

1948–1970

1971–1992

Premier Division League

Senior Division League

Champions

Champions by tier
The list contains the total number of Dhaka League titles that clubs in Dhaka have attained by its different tiers.

Champions by team 
The list includes the  total number of Dhaka League titles that clubs in Dhaka have attained.

Top Scorers

Records

Undefeated teams
Mohammedan SC (1959, 1966, 1969, 1978, 1983, 1985–1990, 1996)

1959 : Mohammedan SC became the first recorded undefeated champions in the East Pakistani era. The clubs captain Asharaf Chowdhury was top scorer in the league. Although it is an unrecognised record, he scored a total of 56 league goals that year.

1966 : Mohammedan SC were undefeated league champions for the second time in the East Pakistani era.

1969 : Mohammedan SC were undefeated league champions for the third time in the East Pakistani era. The regular front three included wingers Pratap Shankar Hazra, Golam Sarwar Tipu alongside Makrani center forward Idris.

1978 : Mohammedan SC were undefeated champions again, in the normal league round they played 15 matches (8 wins and 7 draws), by the end of the Super League round they played a total of 24 matches (14 wins and 10 draws). Throughout the season they scored 44 goals and conceded 12 finishing with 38 points. Brothers Union finished runners-up with 33 points.

1983 : Runners-up Mohammedan SC were unbeaten alongside champions Abahani Krira Chakra. The team earned 35 points (12 wins and 11 draws), scored 35 and conceded 35.

1985–1990 : Mohammedan SC were undefeated in the Dhaka League from 8 September 1985 to 15 March 1990, which is the longest unbeaten run in Bangladeshi domestic football history. They were undefeated for one thousand six hundred and fifty days winning 63 times, drawing 12 times and 1 match ended up being postponed. They scored 160 and conceded 22 goals. The Black and Whites took the league title three times in a row from 1986 to 1989 (1986, 1987 and 1988–89).

1996 : Mohammedan SC became the last undefeated champions of the Dhaka League before it was replaced as the top-tier by the B.League. They played 18 matches (15 wins and 3 draws), scored 30 and conceded 6. They finished the season with 48 points which was 5 more than runners-up Abahani Limited Dhaka.

Abahani Limited Dhaka (1977, 1983, 1992, 1994)
1977 : Abahani Krira Chakra become the first club in indpendent Bangladesh to win the league as undefeated champions. Throughout the season they played 15 matches (10 wins and 5 draws), they scored a total of 27 goals and conceded 5. They finished the season with 25 points while Team BJMC finished as runners-up with 22 points.

1983 : Abahani Krira Chakra became undefeated champions while Mohammedan SC finished the season as unbeaten runners-up. Abahani  won the league title with 41 points from 23 matches (18 wins and 5 draws), scoring 44 and conceding 6.

1992 : Abahani Limited Dhaka finished the league season as undefeated champions for the third time in its history. They played a total of 19 matches (18 wins and 1 draw), scored 53 goals and conceded 9. With 37 points they had four points more than runners-up Mohammedan SC. Their only draw in the league came in the round 18 against Mohammedan SC (1–1), the goalscorers were Boris Kuznetsov for Mohammedan and Mamun Joarder for Abahani.

1994 : Abahani Limited Dhaka were crowned undefeated league champions for the fourth time in its history. The team captained by Monem Munna, played 18 matches (10 wins 8 draws), scored 33 and conceded 8. They finished the season with 28 points which was 3 more than runners-up Muktijoddha SKC.

Team BJMC (1980)
1980 : Team BJMC became the first club to become unbeaten league runners-up, finishing a point behind Mohammedan SC with 37 points from 22 games (15 wins and 7 draws). Throughout the league season they conceded a total of 34 goals and conceded 6, under coach  Selimullah. They were captained by Mostafa Hossain Mokul, while Sheikh Mohammad Aslam was their highest scorer with 13 goals.

Top goal scorers

Unrecognised all-time top scorer : Mari Chowdhury
Season: 1951–1969
Number of goals: 234
Team: Fire Service SC, Azad Sporting Club, Mohammedan SC, BIDC, Dhaka Wanderers

Most goals in a season : Abdus Salam Murshedy
Season: 1982
Number of goals: 27
Team: Mohammedan SC

Unrecognised most goals in a season : Ashraf Chowdhury
Season: 1959
Number of goals: 56
Team: Mohammedan SC

Most Top Goal Scorer award wins : Sheikh Mohammad Aslam
Season: 1984, 1985, 1986, 1987, 1989–90	
Total goals: 80
Team: Abahani Limited Dhaka

See also
Aga Khan Gold Cup
Dhaka First Division Football League
Football in Bangladesh

References

External links
Dhaka Football League: Days of Glory at daily-sun.com
History of Dhaka Football at barta24.com
Dhaka Football League Quiz at somewhereinblog
Newspaper articles at kironsportsdesk.com

 
3
Sports leagues established in 1948
Professional sports leagues in Bangladesh
1948 establishments in East Pakistan
Sport in Dhaka
Third level football leagues in Asia